Eucalyptus cladocalyx, commonly known as sugar gum, is a species of eucalypt tree found in the Australian state of South Australia. It is found naturally in three distinct populations - in the Flinders Ranges, Eyre Peninsula and on Kangaroo Island.

Description
The tree notable for its mottled colourful yellow to orange bark, strongly discolourous leaves and inflorescences grouped on leafless branchlets inside the tree crown. The old bark is smooth and grey, shedding in irregular patches to expose the fresh yellowy-brown bark. Flowers are creamy-white in summer. The capsules are barrel to urn shaped.

Each main branch ends with its own little canopy. They are commonly cultivated as farm windbreaks and for timber.

The side-veins in the leaf are at an acute or wider angle and densely  reticulate. The intramarginal vein is parallel to but removed from margin, with small and obscure oil glands.

It flowers in summer, producing white-cream-yellow flowers. The axillary unbranched inflorescence occur in groups of buds 7, 9 or 11 buds per umbel. The buds are often longitudinally striated and scarred, with a rounded operculum, inflexed stamens and cuboid to oblong anthers.

Taxonomy
The species was first formally described by the botanist Ferdinand von Mueller in 1853 in the journal Linnaea: Ein Journal für die Botanik in ihrem ganzen Umfange, oder Beiträge zur Pflanzenkunde.

In 1860, von Mueller referred to Eucalyptus corynocalyx in Fragmenta phytographiae Australiae, citing several earlier publications, including the Linnaea journal article, but all only have a description of E. cladocalyx. Eucalyptus corynocalyx is therefore a nomen illegitimum and a synonym of E. cladocalyx.

The specific epithet is taken from the Ancient Greek words klados, meaning branch, "twig" or "stem" and kalyx, meaning "cup", "cover" or "outer envelope of a flower", in reference to the leafless branchlets that bear the flowers.

In 2013, Dean Nicolle describe three subspecies of E. cladocalyx and the names have been accepted by the Australian Plant Census:
 Eucalyptus cladocalyx F.Muell. subsp. cladocalyx is a lower-growing, more spreading tree than the other subspecies and has short, broad leaves and larger fruit;
 Eucalyptus cladocalyx subsp. crassa D.Nicolle is the tallest-growing subspecies and has long, narrow leaves and large fruit;
 Eucalyptus cladocalyx subsp. petila D.Nicolle is a tall subspecies with erect branches, narrow adult leaves and relatively small fruit.

Distribution
Eucalyptus cladocalyx is endemic to southern parts of South Australia. It is found in three distinct populations: in the southern and central-eastern parts of the Eyre Peninsula, through much of the Flinders Ranges, and on Kangaroo Island. It is most likely part of relic forests of wetter climates from the past.

E. cladocalx has now become naturalised in the South West region of Western Australia, in southern Victoria and, beyond its native range, in some parts of south-eastern South Australia. It is also naturalised overseas in northern and southern Africa, in California, Hawaii, Arizona, Israel, Chile, Greece, Portugal and Spain.

Subspecies cladocalyx is restricted to the southern and eastern Eyre Peninsula, subspecies crassa to Kangaroo Island and subspecies petila to the southern Flinders Ranges.

Uses
The tree has been widely planted across southern Australia, often as a windbreak or shelterbelt, but also for timber and firewood production. The wood is termite resistant, with moderate strength and durability, and can be used for furniture, flooring, posts, construction timber and railway sleepers.

It is a fast-growing tree but is best planted in open sun in clay, loam or sandy soils. It is an efficient user of water and drought and frost tolerant, with flowers that attract bees. It is also known to be a suitable breeding habitat for the Yellow-tailed Black-Cockatoo.

E. cladocalyx is well adapted to regular bushfires and can resprout epicormically. It also produces a large number of seedlings through wind dispersal of seeds.

The hard and heavy heartwood is a pale yellow-brown colour and has fine uniform texture with an interlocked grain.

The dwarf subspecies cladocalyx is sold in the nursery trade as E. cladocalyx 'Nana'.

Weed potential
E. cladocalyx has invaded bushland in Western Australian, where it has been introduced. It has the capacity to spread up to 70 metres away from locations where it has been planted, and seems to survive bush fires more effectively than several local eucalypt species. It has become an invasive species in South Africa, where it is now registered as a category 2 invader plant.

References

 Holliday, I. A field guide to Australian trees (3rd edition), Reed New Holland, 2002
 Cronin, L. Key Guide to Australian Trees, Envirobook, 2000
 Rawlings, M. Regional allozyme divergence in Sugar Gum, Eucalyptus cladocalyx, 2005, Centre for Plant Biodiversity Research

Trees of Australia
Trees of Mediterranean climate
cladocalyx
Flora of South Australia
Myrtales of Australia
Plants described in 1853
Taxa named by Ferdinand von Mueller